Weingarten may refer to:

Places
 Weingarten, Württemberg, Germany
 Weingarten Abbey
 Weingarten (Baden), Germany
 Weingarten, Rhineland-Palatinate, Germany
 Weingarten, Thuringia, Germany
 Weingarten, Switzerland
 Weingarten, Missouri, United States

Other uses
 Weingarten (surname)
 Weingarten Realty, a real estate company
 Weingarten's, a defunct Texas-based grocer
 Weingarten's disease a medical condition
 Weingarten equations in differential geometry
 Weingarten Rights
 The Weingarten Manuscript, a medieval German manuscript

See also 
 Weingartner
 Wingard, Saskatchewan, Canada (an anglicized form of the name)
 Vinograd (disambiguation), Winograd
 Wijngaarden